Jean-Alain Andre Fanchone (born 2 September 1988) is a French professional footballer who plays as a left-back.

Club career
Fanchone won the Coupe Gambardella with Strasbourg in 2006, defeating Karim Benzema's Lyon in the final. He signed his first professional contract in March 2008 with Strasbourg. He made his professional debut on 8 August 2008 during a Ligue 2 match at Dijon and was credited with an assist on that occasion.

In 2011, Fanchone joined Udinese. The following seasons he was loaned to Watford and Nîmes. In 2014, Fanchone was transferred to Petrolul Ploiești.

International career
Born in metropolitan France, Fanchone is of Guadeloupean origin. He has been selected for France at the U18 and U19 level, taking part in the U19 European Championship in 2007.

References

External links

Racingstub profile 

1988 births
Living people
French footballers
French people of Guadeloupean descent
Association football fullbacks
Footballers from Mulhouse
RC Strasbourg Alsace players
AC Arlésien players
Udinese Calcio players
Watford F.C. players
Nîmes Olympique players
FC Petrolul Ploiești players
Stade Brestois 29 players
ASPV Strasbourg players
SC Schiltigheim players
Ligue 1 players
Ligue 2 players
Serie A players
Liga I players
English Football League players
Championnat National 2 players
Championnat National 3 players
French expatriate footballers
French expatriate sportspeople in Italy
Expatriate footballers in Italy
French expatriate sportspeople in England
Expatriate footballers in England
French expatriate sportspeople in Romania
Expatriate footballers in Romania
France youth international footballers